The Gloucester 22 is an American trailerable sailboat that was designed by Stuart Windley and Harry R. Sindle as a cruiser and first built in 1983.

Production
The Gloucester 22 is a development of the 1978 Lockley-Newport LN 23. The Gloucester 22 was built by Gloucester Yachts in the United States from 1983 until the company closed in 1988, having built 100 examples. It was developed into the Classic 22 (Windley) in 1990 and built by Classic Yachts of Chanute, Kansas until 2000.

Design
The Gloucester 22 is a recreational keelboat, built predominantly of fiberglass, with wood trim. It has a fractional sloop rig, a raked stem, a plumb transom, a transom-hung rudder controlled by a tiller and a fixed stub keel, with a retractable centerboard. It displaces  and carries  of ballast.

The boat is normally fitted with a small  outboard motor for docking and maneuvering.

The design has sleeping accommodation for four people, with a double "V"-berth in the bow cabin and a two straight settee berths in the main cabin. The slide-out galley is located on the starboard side just aft of the companionway ladder. The galley is equipped with a two-burner stove.

Operational history
In a 2010 review Steve Henkel wrote, "This vessel ... represents a genre of relatively lightweight and bare-bones designs that can be produced and sold relatively cheaply. Best features: She has the lowest minimum draft with board up compared with her comp[etitor]s, good for exploring shoal waters under power—though ... her stub keel keeps her from being in the easiest group for trailer launching and retrieving. Her high-aspect centerboard drops down to give her a draft of almost five feet, giving good performance to windward. She has six opening ports plus a small ventilation hatch forward, an advantage in sultry weather. Worst features: Construction is only so-so, as the boat is targeted to a thrifty audience. The low cost is obtained partly by offering what is usually standard equipment as optional. A pivoting rudder is optional, but should have been standard; there is danger of clipping it off as it extends below the board-up keel draft."

See also
List of sailing boat types

References

External links
Photo of a Gloucester 22
Photo of a Gloucester 22 showing the stub keel

Keelboats
1980s sailboat type designs
Sailing yachts
Trailer sailers
Sailboat type designs by Stuart Windley
Sailboat type designs by Harry R. Sindle
Sailboat types built by Gloucester Yachts